Chirori Village is a village in Loni tehsil, Ghaziabad district, Uttar Pradesh, India. It is located 16 km north of Ghaziabad, 6 km from Loni and 485 km from the Uttar Pradesh capital, Lucknow.

The postal code for Chirori Village is 201102 and the postal head office is located in Tronica City.

Demographics

According to the 2011 Census of India, Chirori has a total population of 8263, of whom 4351 (52.7%) are male and 3913 (47.3%) are female.

Many doctors, engineers and advocates are present in the village. The village is known by a market called "itwar bazaar." Chirori is dominated by the Baisla Gotra of Gurjar Caste. Banaya and Muslims are also present, albeit in smaller numbers. Hindi is the local language.

Geography
Badshahpur Sirauli (1 km), Sirauli (1 km), Shakal Pura (1 km), Mewla Bhatti (1 km), Kotwalpur (2 km) are a few villages close to Chirori. Chirori is bordered by Khekra Tehsil to its north, North East Delhi to its south, North Delhi Tehsil to its west and  Central Delhi Tehsil to its east.

Loni, Ghaziabad, Muradnagar, Delhi are a few cities close to Chirori.	

Chirori lies at the border between Ghaziabad District and North Delhi District. It is also close to the border between Uttar Pradesh and the National Capital Region.

Transportation

There is a local bus service from Ghaziabad to Loni.

Nusratabad and Noli are two railway stations located very close to Chirori. Ghaziabad is a major railway station located 18 km away from Chirori.

References

Villages in Ghaziabad district, India